Art Hirahara (born 1971) is an American jazz pianist and composer.

Life and career
Hirahara started playing the piano at the age of four. He studied at the Oberlin Conservatory of Music and the California Institute of the Arts. While at Oberlin, he had jazz lessons with pianist Neal Creque. He has been part of the jazz scene in New York since 2003, after moving there from the San Francisco Bay Area.

Hirahara's debut album, Edge of This Earth, was released in 2000. In 2011 Posi-Tone Records released Hirahara's Noble Path, a trio album with Yoshi Waki (bass), and Dan Aran (drums). His next Posi-Tone album, Libations & Meditations from 2015, was a trio recording with bassist Linda Oh (bass) and drummer John Davis.

His album Central Line was released in January 2017.His music video for Brooklyn Express was the winner at the Audio Shoot International Video & Film Festival, the Queen City Film Festival, and the Raleigh Film and Art Festival, all in 2019.

Playing style
According to Nate Chinen at The New York Times, Hirahara "brings a broad base of knowledge to his enterprise: electronic composition, West African music, Balinese gamelan, [and] multiple strains of the avant-garde".

Discography
An asterisk (*) indicates that the year is that of release.

As leader/co-leader

As sideman

References

1971 births
American jazz pianists
American male pianists
Living people
Place of birth missing (living people)
Oberlin Conservatory of Music alumni
California Institute of the Arts alumni
21st-century American pianists
21st-century American male musicians
American male jazz musicians
Posi-Tone Records artists
Travis Sullivan's Bjorkestra members